The Sam Adams Award is given annually to an intelligence professional who has taken a stand for integrity and ethics. The Award is granted by the Sam Adams Associates for Integrity in Intelligence, a group of retired CIA officers. It is named after Samuel A. Adams, a CIA whistleblower during the Vietnam War, and takes the physical form of a "corner-brightener candlestick".

Ray McGovern established the Sam Adams Associates "to reward intelligence officials who demonstrated a commitment to truth and integrity, no matter the consequences."

The 2012 and 2013 and 2014 Awards were presented at the Oxford Union.

Recipients
 2002: Coleen Rowley
 2003: Katharine Gun, former British intelligence (GCHQ) translator; leaked top-secret information showing illegal US activities during the push for war in Iraq.
 2004: Sibel Edmonds, former FBI translator; fired after accusing FBI officials of ignoring intelligence pointing to al-Qaeda attacks against the US.
 2005: Craig Murray, former British ambassador to Uzbekistan who blew the whistle on UK complicity in the Uzbek government's use of torture and involvement in extraordinary rendition.
 2006: Samuel Provance, former U.S. Army military intelligence sergeant; spoke out about abuses at the Abu Ghraib Prison.
 2007: Andrew Wilkie, retired Australian intelligence official; claimed intelligence was being exaggerated to justify Australian support for the US invasion of Iraq.
 2008: Frank Grevil, Danish whistleblower; leaked classified information showing no clear evidence of weapons of mass destruction in Iraq.
 2009: Larry Wilkerson, former chief of staff to United States Secretary of State Colin Powell and Iraq War critic.
 2010: Julian Assange, editor-in-chief and founder of WikiLeaks.
 2011: Thomas Andrews Drake, former senior executive of the U.S. National Security Agency (NSA); Jesselyn Radack, former ethics adviser to the U.S. Department of Justice.
 2012: Thomas Fingar, former chairman of the National Intelligence Council.
 2013: Edward Snowden, leaked NSA material showing mass surveillance by the agency, sparking heated debate.
 2014: Chelsea Manning, U.S. Army soldier convicted in July 2013 of violations of the Espionage Act and other offenses.
 2015: William Binney, former highly placed intelligence official with the NSA turned whistleblower.
 2016: John Kiriakou, former CIA analyst and case officer who publicly confirmed the employment of waterboarding against detainees and characterized the practice as torture.
 2017: Seymour Hersh, Pulitzer Prize-winning investigative journalist who reported on the My Lai massacre, the Abu Ghraib scandal, and alleged misrepresentations of the 2013 Ghouta attack and the 2017 Khan Shaykhun attack.
 2018: Karen Kwiatkowski, U.S. Air Force officer who became a whistleblower, leaking material behind the film Shock and Awe.
 2019: Jeffrey Sterling, CIA whistleblower.
 2020: Annie Machon, MI5 whistleblower.
 2021: Daniel Hale, U.S. Air Force enlisted airman who became an intelligence analyst for the NSA in Afghanistan and later exposed the consequences of drone strikes.

References

Sources

 
 ] -->
 
 
 
 
 
 
 
 
 
 
 
 
 
 
 ] -->

External links
 

2002 establishments in the United States
Articles containing video clips
Awards established in 2002
Espionage scandals and incidents
Intelligence and espionage-related awards and decorations
Whistleblowing in the United States